CSS Chicora was a Confederate ironclad ram that fought in the American Civil War. It was built under contract at Charleston, South Carolina in 1862. James M. Eason built it to John L. Porter's plans, using up most of a $300,000 State appropriation for construction of marine batteries; Eason received a bonus for "skill and promptitude." Keeled in March, it was commissioned in November, Commander John Randolph Tucker, CSN assuming command.

In thick, predawn haze on January 31, 1863, Chicora and  raided the Federal blockading force of unarmored ships lying just outside the entrance to Charleston Harbor. With ram and gun, Palmetto State forced  to surrender, then disabled , who had to be towed to safety. Chicora meanwhile engaged other Union ships in a long-range gun duel, from which it emerged unscathed to withdraw victoriously to shelter inside the harbor.

It took part in the defense of the forts at Charleston on April 7 when they were attacked by a squadron of ironclad monitors under Rear Admiral Samuel Francis du Pont, USN. The Federal ships were forced to retire for repairs and did not resume the action.

Chicora was actively employed in the fighting around Charleston during 1863 and 1864. Its valuable services included the transporting of troops during the evacuation of Morris Island, and the bombardment of Forts Sumter, Gregg, and Wagner. In August 1863 she had the distinction of furnishing the first volunteer officer and crew for the Confederate Submarine Torpedo Boat H. L. Hunley.

"A Lieutenant’s commission in the Confederate States Navy was conferred on me, with orders to report for duty on the ironclad Chicora at Charleston. My duties were those of a deck officer, and I had charge of the first division. On the occasion of the attack upon the blockading squadron ... It was my part, on the memorable morning, to aim and fire one effective shell into the Keystone State while running down to attack us, which (according to Captain LeRoy’s report), killing twenty-one men and severely wounding fifteen, caused him to haul down his flag in token of surrender. The enemy now kept at a respectful distance while preparing their ironclad vessels to sail up more closely. Our Navy Department continued slowly to construct more of these rams, all on the same general plan, fit for little else than harbor defense." -- William T. Glassell, Lt. CSN

It was destroyed by the Confederates when Charleston was evacuated on February 18, 1865.

References

Notes

Bibliography
 
 
 
 
 
 
 
 Coker, PC, "Charleston's Maritime Heritage 1670–1865", Charleston, CokerCraft Press 1987
 Prisoners of the Civil War; The Paragon Agency, Publishers; 2001

External links
 

Ironclad warships of the Confederate States Navy
Ships built in Charleston, South Carolina
Shipwrecks of the American Civil War
Shipwrecks of the Carolina coast
1862 ships
Ship fires
Maritime incidents in February 1865